The Seventh-day Adventist Church in New Zealand is formally organised as the New Zealand Pacific Union Conference of Seventh-day Adventists (often abbreviated as NZPUC), a sub-entity of the South Pacific Division of Seventh-day Adventists. The membership of the Union is 20,943 as of 30 June 2020. The population to membership ratio is 1 Adventist to every 268 people. The headquarters for the Union is in Auckland, New Zealand.

History 

Stephen N. Haskell, an Adventist missionary visited New Zealand four months after his first visit. He began marketing The Bible Echo and Signs of the Times (Australia/New Zealand version), two religious papers of the church. His truth was soon accepted by Edward Hare and his wife, who ran the boarding house in which he stayed. His success caused the Seventh-day Adventist church in America to send Arthur G. Daniells, an evangelist and former teacher, to further the work. Daniells' preaching soon paved way for the first Seventh-day Adventist church in New Zealand was opened in Ponsonby (a suburb of Auckland), on 15 October 1887. Daniells later became the world president of the church.

Organisations 
The union operates six educational facilities in New Zealand and the Pacific Islands between elementary and secondary school level. Its network of schools educates nearly 2000 students. The church also operates a radio station in Tahiti, six Adventist Book Centres, a nursing home and retirement centre and Sanitarium Health Food Company NZ.

Conferences and missions 
 North New Zealand Conference website
 South New Zealand Conference
 French Polynesia Mission website
 Cook Islands Mission
 New Caledonia Mission
 Pitcairn Field Station

See also 
 South Pacific Division of Seventh-day Adventists
 Seventh-day Adventist Church
 North New Zealand Conference of Seventh-day Adventists

References 

Other resources:
 Seventh-day Adventist Encyclopedia
 
 In and Out of the World: Seventh-day Adventists in New Zealand, ed. P. H. Ballis

External links 
 New Zealand Pacific Union Conference of Seventh-day Adventists official website
 New Zealand Beginnings on the official Adventist website
 Adventist Directory New Zealand Pacific Union Conference
 Adventist Statistics for the New Zealand Pacific Union Conference
 Adventist Yearbook entry on the New Zealand Pacific Union Conference

History of the Seventh-day Adventist Church
Adventism by country
Seventh-day Adventist Church in Oceania